St John's Church, also known as St John's Baillieston, is a 19th-century parish church of the Scottish Episcopal Church, in the Baillieston area of Glasgow, Scotland.

History
The church was built in the Neo-Gothic style in 1850, and was opened on 27 December 1850. It was then consecrated in 1851, and became an Incumbency. St John's was united with St Serf's Church, Shettleston and St Kentigern's, Dennistoun in January 1996, to form a united parish named East End Ministry.

References

John
1850 establishments in Scotland
Churches completed in 1850